An envelope is the paper container used to hold a letter being sent by post.

Envelope may also refer to:

In mathematics 
 Envelope (mathematics), a curve, surface, or higher-dimensional object defined as being tangent to a given family of lines or curves (or surfaces, or higher-dimensional objects, respectively)
 Envelope (category theory)

In science 
 Viral envelope, the membranal covering surrounding the capsid of a virus
 Cell envelope of a bacterium, consisting of the cell membrane, cell wall and outer membrane
 , the fabric skin covering the airship
 Building envelope, the exterior layer of a building that protects it from the elements
 Envelope (motion), a solid representing all positions that an object may occupy during its normal range of motion
 Envelope (music), the variation of a sound over time, as is used in sound synthesis
 Envelope (radar), the volume of space where a radar system is required to reliably detect an object
 Envelope (waves), a curve outlining the peak values of an oscillating waveform or signal
 Envelope detector, an electronic circuit used to measure the envelope of a waveform
 Flight envelope, the limits within which an aircraft can operate

In entertainment 
 Envelopes (band), an indie/pop band from Sweden and France, based in the UK
 Envelope (film), a 2012 film
 "Envelopes", a song by Frank Zappa from his 1982 album Ship Arriving Too Late to Save a Drowning Witch

Other uses 
 Envelope (military), attacking one or both of the enemy's flanks to encircle the enemy
 The envelope of an internet email, its SMTP routing information
 Envelope system, a method of personal budgeting where money is allocated for specific purposes

See also
 Two envelopes problem, a paradox
 Stellar envelope (disambiguation), for astrophysics uses